Lon Chaney (April 1, 1883 – August 26, 1930) was an American actor during the age of silent films.  He is regarded as one of cinema's most versatile and powerful actors, renowned for his characterizations of tortured, sometimes grotesque and afflicted characters, and his groundbreaking artistry with makeup. Chaney is known for his starring roles in such silent horror films as The Hunchback of Notre Dame (1923) and The Phantom of the Opera (1925). His ability to transform himself using makeup techniques that he developed earned him the nickname "The Man of a Thousand Faces."

Cast in films

Directed films

References

Notes

Male actor filmographies
American filmographies